Parvathy Nambiar is an Indian actress and dancer known for her work in Malayalam Cinema.

Personal life
She got engaged to Vineeth Menon in 2019 and married him in 2020.

Filmography

Television

Play

References

External links
 

Living people
21st-century Indian actresses
Actresses in Malayalam cinema
Indian film actresses
Year of birth missing (living people)
Actresses in Tamil cinema